Bengt Larsson (born 27 January 1927) is a Swedish retired ice hockey player. Larsson was part of the Djurgården Swedish champions' team of 1950, 1955, and 1958.

References

1927 births
Djurgårdens IF Hockey players
Possibly living people
Swedish ice hockey players